Dorstenia bowmanniana is a species of plant in the family Moraceae. It is native to eastern Brazil.

References

bowmanniana
Plants described in 1871
Flora of Brazil